Artyom Olegovich Bludnov (born 5 September 1988) is a Russian former football midfielder.

Club career
He made his debut in the Russian Football National League for FC Baltika Kaliningrad on 19 August 2011 in a game against FC Shinnik Yaroslavl.

References

External links

1988 births
Living people
Russian footballers
Association football midfielders
Russian expatriate footballers
Expatriate footballers in Latvia
Expatriate footballers in Moldova
Expatriate footballers in Belarus
Dinaburg FC players
FC Vitebsk players
FC Baltika Kaliningrad players
FC Sakhalin Yuzhno-Sakhalinsk players
FC Academia Chișinău players
FC Tekstilshchik Ivanovo players
FC Neftekhimik Nizhnekamsk players
FC Khimik Dzerzhinsk players